Landi Kotal railway station is a railway station in Landi Kotal, a town in the Khyber Pakhtunkhwa province of Pakistan.  It lies near the border with the Nangarhar Province of Afghanistan.  The railway station was built in 1925 during British rule. It was the terminus railway station of Khyber Pass Railway.

History
The Landi-Kotal railway station was opened in November 1925 alongside the Khyber Pass Railway's newly laid tracks between Jamrud and Landi Kotal. In 1982, regular service to the Landi Kotal railway station was terminated. However, beginning in the 1990s, the station served as the terminus of the Khyber train safari, a tourist train running from Peshawar to Landi Kotal via the Khyber Pass. The route was closed in 2006 due to extensive flooding.

See also
 List of railway stations in Pakistan
 Pakistan Railways

References

External links

Railway stations in Khyber District
Railway stations on Khyber Pass line